The Capitulation of Dornbirn (13 November 1805) saw the French VII Corps under Marshal Pierre Augereau face an Austrian force led by Franz Jellacic. Isolated near Lake Constance (Bodensee) by superior numbers of French troops, Jellacic surrendered his command. The event occurred during the War of the Third Coalition, part of the Napoleonic Wars.

The Ulm Campaign in October 1805 was catastrophic for Austria, with only the corps of Michael von Kienmayer and Franz Jellacic escaping envelopment and capture by the Grande Armée of Napoleon. While Kienmayer's troops withdrew east toward Vienna, the only escape route open to Jellacic was to the south. As some of Napoleon's corps moved south into the Alps and the Austrian army of Archduke Charles, Duke of Teschen withdrew from Italy, Jellacic's force was cut off from the rest of Austria. In a remarkable trek, his cavalry set off for Bohemia and evaded capture. However, Augereau's late-arriving corps moved into the Vorarlberg and, after a number of clashes, trapped Jellacic's infantry at Dornbirn. The day before Jellacic's surrender, the French occupied the Austrian capital of Vienna, but the war would not be decided until the Battle of Austerlitz was fought on 2 December.

Capitulation
Augereau's VII Corps numbered 14,000 men and consisted of two infantry divisions led by Generals of Division Jacques Desjardin and Maurice Mathieu. In the 1805 campaign there was no corps cavalry brigade. Jellacic's command consisted of the 2nd Jager Battalion, three battalions each of the Stain Infantry Regiment Nr. 50 and the Franz Jellacic Infantry Regiment Nr. 62, the Grenadier Battalion of the Beaulieu Infantry Regiment Nr. 58, and one and one-half combined battalions. The capitulation included three generals, 160 officers, 3,895 rank and file, and seven colors. The soldiers were allowed to march to Bohemia after giving up their weapons and promising not to fight against France for one year.

Aftermath
One Austrian brigade led by General-major Prince Louis Victor de Rohan became separated from Archduke John's army. Hoping to join Feldmarschall-Leutnant Johann von Hiller's wing of Archduke Charles' army in Italy, Rohan looked to the south. Starting from Landeck in the County of Tyrol on 10 November, he marched to the south. Missing both Hiller and Charles, he determined to cut his way to Venice. Seizing Bolzano on 18 November, he then marched his brigade south to Trento. Turning east into the Val Sugana and south into the Brenta River valley, the Austrians surprised the French garrison of Bassano on 22 November. Marching hard, the Austrians reached Castelfranco Veneto the next evening. On 24 November, Rohan's epic march came to an end in the Battle of Castelfranco Veneto when his troops were trapped between the divisions of Generals of Division Jean Reynier and Laurent Gouvion Saint-Cyr. After a brief struggle, 4,400 Austrian soldiers surrendered.

Notes

References

External links
 

Battles involving France
Battles involving Austria
Battles of the Napoleonic Wars
Battles of the War of the Third Coalition
Conflicts in 1805
1805 in the Austrian Empire
November 1805 events